Forrest "Forddy" Anderson (March 17, 1919 – October 25, 1999) was an American basketball coach. He was the first coach in NCAA history to take two different teams to the Final Four; Bradley in 1950 and 1954 and Michigan State in 1957.

Early life
The Gary, Indiana native led his Ralph W. Emerson High to an IHSAA Sectional title in 1937; he was recruited to Stanford University by fellow Indiana native Everett Dean. Anderson was named All-Pacific Coast after the 1940–41 season; after Pearl Harbor was attacked, he joined the US Navy and spent two years at Great Lakes Training Facility, where he played basketball for Tony Hinkle.

Coaching career
After completing his Stanford degree in 1946, he was hired as the basketball coach at Drake University. Anderson was considered one of the most innovative coaches of his era and served a combined 24 seasons as head men's basketball coach at Drake University (1946–1948), Bradley University (1948–1954), Michigan State University (1954–1965) and Hiram Scott College (1965–1970).

Anderson twice led his Bradley teams to the NCAA Finals (1950 and 1954). His 1950 team also finished as the NIT runner-up.

He moved to Michigan State, where his 1957 Big Ten Champion Michigan State club finished fourth in the NCAA tournament and his 1959 Michigan State team lost in the Elite Eight (regional finals).

He was fired in the spring of 1965, whereupon he was recruited to assist in creating the athletic department at Hiram Scott College. After Hiram Scott closed its doors, he was the head coach of Peru's national team during the 1970–71 FIBA seasons.

He then began a long career as a collegiate scout for the Boston Celtics during the 1980s and 1990s. He was instrumental in many of the Celtics' draft picks during that era.

Personal

Forddy Anderson and his wife Constance "Pat" Anderson were the parents of four children, Constance, Barbara, Forrest Jr. (Frosty) and Tracey.  Anderson died on October 25, 1999, in Oklahoma City, Oklahoma, at the age of 80, after suffering from complications due to pneumonia.

Head coaching record

See also
 List of NCAA Division I Men's Final Four appearances by coach

References

1919 births
1999 deaths
American men's basketball coaches
American men's basketball players
Basketball coaches from Indiana
Basketball players from Gary, Indiana
Bradley Braves men's basketball coaches
College athletic directors in the United States
College men's basketball head coaches in the United States
Drake Bulldogs men's basketball coaches
Michigan State Spartans men's basketball coaches
Sportspeople from Gary, Indiana
Stanford Cardinal men's basketball players
United States Navy personnel of World War II